BR-174 is a federal highway of Brazil. The  road connects Cáceres to Pacaraima on the Venezuelan border.
It is the only road connection of the state of Roraima with the rest of the country. 458 kilometres are under construction, and there is no bridge over the Amazon River.

Nocturnal closure

The highway is closed on the Waimiri Atroari Indigenous Territory every day between 18:30 and 06:00 of the following day. It is advisable to not stop inside the reserve. The reserve is occupied by nocturnal animals and some of the natives have nocturnal routine, too. Even during the day the number of accidents involving animals and cars is elevated.

Paving status
Between the border of Brazil and Venezuela and Manaus, 974 km was paved in 1998, at the FHC government. Going to the state of Mato Grosso, the road has asphalt between Manaus and Careiro. The road was implanted between Careiro and Manicoré, but the floor is still dirt in that stretch. Between Manicoré and Juína, the road alternates stretches of dirt with stretches not yet deployed. Among Juína and Vilhena the road is still dirt, however, there is a forecast of paving, for this stretch. In the 542 km between Vilhena and Cáceres, the road is paved.

References

Federal highways in Brazil
Transport in Roraima